The Pembrokeshire Coalfield in West Wales is one of the smallest British coalfields, but continuously worked from the 14th to 20th centuries. The main coalfield extends across south Pembrokeshire from Saundersfoot on Carmarthen Bay westwards to Broad Haven on St Brides Bay. A small detached portion of the field is centred on Newgale on St Brides Bay.

The coalfield is in effect the westernmost extension of the South Wales Coalfield though it is separated from the main body of that field by Carmarthen Bay.

Seams
Coal seams within the Pembrokeshire Coalfield are traditionally referred to as veins. The following sequence is recognised in the west of the district:

The Stonepit and Quarry Veins are collectively referred to as the Sibbernock Veins. The sequence from the Three Quarter to the Foot Vein constitutes the Newgale, Simpson and Eweston Coals.

In contrast in the centre and east of the district, there are fewer veins in what is a more compressed sequence:
 Rock Vein
 Timber Vein
 Lower Level Vein
 Kilgetty Vein
 Tan Pits Vein

History
Coal mining in Pembrokeshire dates back at least to the early 14th century. The coal was used locally or exported by sea from local ports. It was generally high-quality anthracite, but seams were mostly thin, with the best coal only available at some depth. In 1603 George Owen of Henllys described a typical colliery as employing 16 people working from 6am to 6pm. In the 1700s collieries were employing men, women and boys for a few pence a day, rising to a shilling (for men) by 1806. By the 19th century coal mining had become an important local industry with many farmers operating mines or carting as a supplement to their income. By 1865 the coalfield was employing nearly 1,000 people. Decline began in the 19th century, with many collieries closing after 1900, but others retained a strong link between mining and agriculture. Some collieries continued into the 20th century until the industry was nationalised in 1947, when the last colliery, at Kilgetty, closed.

See also
Coal in the United Kingdom
History of coal mining in Great Britain

References

External links
 UK Government Development Risk Map
 UK Government Specific Risk Map
 UK Government Surface Coal Resource Map

Coal mining in Wales
Geography of Pembrokeshire
Coal mining regions in Wales